The North Atlantic moist mixed forests is a temperate broadleaf and mixed forest ecoregion in Northwestern Europe. It consists of maritime forests and heathlands on the western and northern coasts of Ireland, Scotland, and neighboring islands. The ecoregion has undergone major habitat loss.

Location

The North Atlantic moist mixed forests occur along the western and northern coasts of Ireland and Scotland,  stretching from southwestern Ireland to the north coast of Scotland, and including the Hebrides, Shetland, Orkney, and Faroe islands.

Flora
Naturally-occurring plant communities include:
 Hemiboreal pine forests, predominantly of Scots pine (Pinus sylvestris) with deciduous broadleaf trees.
 Atlantic dwarf shrub heaths, composed of low shrubs, grasses, herbs, and mosses. Dry heaths are characterized by ling (Calluna vulgaris), bell heather (Erica cinerea), cross-leaved heath (Erica tetralix), and blaeberry (Vaccinium myrtillus). Wet heaths are characterized by the shrubs E. tetralix and bog-myrtle (Myrica gale), the sedge Scirpus cespitosus, and purple moor-grass (Molinia caerulea).
 Ombrotrophic mires (quaking bogs) in north-central Scotland.

Fauna
Red fox
Badger
Roe deer
Red deer
Barn owl

Threats

Western Scotland's and Ireland's forests have undergone significant habitat loss and damage through deforestation and hunting of its once abundant wildlife. Animals such as the grey wolf, wild boar, brown bear, European bison, Eurasian lynx, tarpan and golden eagle used to inhabit the forests; however, due to over-hunting and excessive timber extraction, the animals have lost their habitats. The North Atlantic moist mixed forests ecoregion is classified as critical/endangered by the World Wildlife Fund.

Protected areas
Protected areas in the ecoregion include:
 Caithness and Sutherland Peatlands Special Protection Area (1453.13 km2), Scotland
 Glenveagh National Park (334.46 km2), Republic of Ireland
 Lewis Peatlands (589.84 km2), Scotland
 Stack's to Mullaghareirk Mountains, West Limerick Hills and Mount Eagle Special Protection Area (556 km2), Republic of Ireland

Prehistory

The ecoregion is relatively young with regard to human settlement, due to glaciation during the most recent ice age, less than 10,000 years ago. Mesolithic peoples were certainly in evidence circa 9000 to 8000 years ago throughout the present day Irish portion of the ecoregion, as well as somewhat later in the western Scotland areas of the North Atlantic moist mixed forests. Neolithic farming ensued, as grain farming technologies developed, along with advancing forms of livestock tending, along with appearance of some of the early Neolithic and Bronze Age archaeological monumental sites in the region including standing stones and stone circles.

See also

 Ancient woodland
 Biodiversity
 Biodiversity action plan
 Bioregionalism
 Community forests in England
 Conservation biology
 Forestry Commission
 Geology of England
 List of ecoregions
 List of forests in the United Kingdom
 National nature reserves in England
 Protected areas of the United Kingdom
 Trees of Britain and Ireland

External links
 http://www.forestry.gov.uk/ UK forestry commission website
 http://www.globalspecies.org/ecoregions/display/PA0429

References

 
Ecoregions of Ireland
Ecoregions of the United Kingdom
Fauna of Ireland
Fauna of Scotland
Flora of Ireland
Flora of Scotland
Palearctic ecoregions
Temperate broadleaf and mixed forests